Open Blueprint was an IBM framework developed in the early 1990s (and released in March 1992) that provided a standard for connecting network computers.  The open blueprint structure reduced redundancy by combining protocols.

References 

IBM software